GGSE may refer to:
 Gravity-gradient stabilization, a method of stabilizing artificial satellites
 GGSE-1, a technology satellite launched by the US military in 1964
 Gevirtz Graduate School of Education, University of California at Santa Barbara

See also

 
 
 GSE (disambiguation)